Ganduo is a town in Gaoyou, Yangzhou, Jiangsu.  , it has 3 residential communities and 16 villages under its administration.

References

Gaoyou
Township-level divisions of Jiangsu